Bidestan (also Romanized as Bīdestān) is a village in Qaleh Tall Rural District, in the Central District of Bagh-e Malek County, Khuzestan Province, Iran. At the 2006 census, its population was 95, in 22 families.

References 

Populated places in Bagh-e Malek County